Wait for Me and I Will Not Come is a 2009 Serbian drama film directed by Miroslav Momčilović.

Cast 
 Miloš Samolov - Bane
 Mirjana Karanović - Andja
 Gordan Kičić - Alek
  - Teodora
 Branislav Trifunović - Nemanja
 Vanja Ejdus - Marina
 Petar Božović - Milenko
 Jelena Đokić - Dejana
  - Razredna
 Ljubomir Bandović - Todor

References

External links 

2009 drama films
2009 films
Serbian drama films
Films set in Belgrade